Manda-Inakir is a system of fissure vents and cinder cones located along the borders between Djibouti, Eritrea and Ethiopia. Last erupting in 1928, it produced a cinder cone called Kammourta. It has an elevation of over 600 metres.

See also
Emba Soira

References

Manda-Inakir

Volcanoes of Ethiopia
Volcanoes of Djibouti
Fissure vents
Cinder cones